The Potato Range, formerly gazetted as the Potato Mountains, is a small mountain range in southwestern British Columbia, Canada, located between Chilko Lake and Tatlayoko Lake. It has an area of 320 km2 and is a subrange of the Chilcotin Ranges which in turn form part of the Pacific Ranges of the Coast Mountains.

See also
List of mountain ranges

References

Chilcotin Ranges